GlobalData Plc is a data analytics and consulting company, headquartered in London, England. The company was established in 1999, and has been listed on the London Stock Exchange since 2000. It was previously called Progressive Digital Media and before that, the TMN Group. GlobalData employs over 3000 personnel across its offices across the UK, US, Argentina, South Korea, Mexico, China, Japan, India and Australia. It has an R&D centre is in India. The group is chaired by Murray Legg a former partner at PwC and the company founder, Mike Danson, is CEO. Danson was also one of the founders of Datamonitor.

Progressive media acquired Current Analysis Inc in 2014.

Background
PDM was founded in 2007 as a holding company for a set of media assets purchased from Wilmington plc; it expanded further by a series of acquisitions, purchasing Business Review from Datamonitor PLC in July 2008, followed in November 2008 by acquiring the entire share capital of SPG Media Group PLC.

In 2009, the listed marketing services business TMN, which was chaired by former Datamonitor non-executive director Peter Harkness, was acquired via a reverse takeover by Progressive Digital Media Ltd, and changed its name to Progressive Digital Media Group Ltd. Harkness stayed on the Board as a non-executive and remains so today.

On July 27, 2015, Progressive Digital Media announced that it had agreed to acquire Datamonitor Financial, Datamonitor Consumer, MarketLine and Verdict businesses from Informa for a combined cash price of £25m. 

In January 2016, PDM bought the GlobalData Holding Ltd business and changed its own name to GlobalData PLC.

References

External links
GlobalData PLC
SPG Media 
London Stock Exchange

Market research companies of the United Kingdom
Companies based in the City of London